Seodaejeon station, meaning "West Daejeon station", is on the normal speed Honam Line, 161 km south of Yongsan Station.

History
The station opened on November 1, 1936 and KTX trains on the normal speed Honam Line began services on April 1, 2004.

Services
Seodaejeon station serves all KTX, SRT, ITX-Saemaeul & Mugunghwa trains on the normal speed Honam Line to Iksan (KTX terminates there only), Gwangju (ITX-Saemaeul and Mugunghwa trains only) or Mokpo.

Access
The station is accessible by bus, or by walking from Metro line 1 station Oryong (approx. 12 min walk) or the slightly farther station Seodaejeon Negeori (approx. 15 min walk).

Surroundings tourist site
Bomunsan, which is located in Daejosa-dong, Jung-gu, Daejeon, and 11 other dongs, is one of the eight monuments in Daejeon. There are many cultural properties along with resting places such as Bomun Land, Pupu Land, Youth Square, Bomunsan Park (Sajung Park), outdoor music hall, observatory, amusement facilities and cable car. There are also 10 trails, including Sylbong Road, Moonpilbong Road, and Mountain Road. The top of the mountain is a meaningful mountain with cultural assets and monuments such as Bomunsan fortress, Mae Arya, and Bomunsa Temple.

See also
 Transportation in South Korea
 Korail
 KTX

External links
 Cyber station information from Korail

References

Korea Train Express stations
Railway stations in Daejeon
Railway stations opened in 1936
Jung District, Daejeon